Hadrobregmini is a tribe of death-watch beetles in the family Ptinidae. There are at least 3 genera and about 16 described species in Hadrobregmini.

Genera
These genera belong to the tribe Hadrobregmini:
 Allobregmus Español, 1970
 Belemia Español, 1984
 Desmatogaster Knutson, 1963 i c g
 Hadrobregmus Thomson, 1859 i c g b
 Megabregmus Español, 1970
 Priobium Motschulsky, 1845 i c g b
 Trichobiopsis White, 1973 g
Data sources: i = ITIS, c = Catalogue of Life, g = GBIF, b = Bugguide.net

References

Further reading

External links

 

Anobiinae